The 2022 British Academy Scotland Awards are due to be held on 20 November 2022 in Glasgow, Scotland.

Nominees
The nominations were announced on 12 October and the winners were announced on 20 November. Winners are listed first and highlighted in boldface.

Outstanding Contribution to Film & Television

 Peter Capaldi

References

2022
2022 in British cinema
British Academy Scotland Awards
British Academy Scotland Awards
British Academy Scotland Awards
British Academy Scotland Awards
British Academy Scotland Awards
British Academy Scotland Awards
British Academy Scotland Awards, 2022